Yogiraja is a title of Shiva, meaning "King of Yoga." It is also an honorific often given to an advanced yogi, especially a teacher of yoga.
Forms of Shiva